The blue poison dart frog or blue poison arrow frog (Dendrobates tinctorius "azureus") is a poison dart frog found in the forests surrounded by the Sipaliwini Savanna, which is located in southern Suriname (known in Surinamese Dutch as blauwe pijlgifkikker, and adjacent far northern Brazil. D. tinctorius azureus is also known by its indigenous Tirio name, okopipi. Its scientific name comes from its azure (blue) color. While frequently considered a valid species in the past, recent authorities treat it as a variant of D. tinctorius.

Description

D. tinctorius "Azureus" is a medium-sized frog that weighs about 8 g and grows to 3.0-4.5 cm in length. Females are larger and about half a centimetre longer than males, but males have larger toes. The frog has a typical lifespan of five to seven years in the wild. Its bright blue skin, usually darker around its limbs and stomach, serves as a warning to predators. The glands of poisonous alkaloids located a defence mechanism to potential predators. These poisons paralyze and sometimes kill the predator. The black spots are unique to each frog, enabling individuals to be identified. This species of frog has a distinctive hunch-backed posture.
Each foot has four toes, which each have a flattened tip with a suction cup pad used for gripping. The tips of the toes in females are round, while males have heart-shaped tips.

As with almost all frogs, tadpoles differ greatly in appearance from adults. They have a long tail, about 6  mm, with a total length of around 10  mm. They lack legs and have gills instead of lungs.

Behavior

D. tinctorius "Azureus"  the blue poison dart frog is a mainland animal, but stays close to water sources. These frogs spend most of their awake time, during the day, hopping around in short leaps. They are very territorial and aggressive both towards their own species and others very much like other poison dart frogs. To ward off intruders, they use a series of calls, chases, and wrestling.
Although poison dart frogs are known for their skin toxins, used on the tips of arrows or darts of natives, in reality only the species of the genus Phyllobates are used in this manner. In captivity, the frogs lose toxicity as a result of altered diets.

Reproduction
The blue poison dart frog breeds seasonally, usually during February or March when the weather is rainy. To find mates, the males sit on a rock and produce quiet calls, which the females follow to track down the males. The females then physically fight over a male. The male takes the female to a quiet place by the water, which becomes the site of the egg-laying. Fertilization occurs externally; once the eggs are laid, the male covers them in his sperm.

Between five and 10 offspring are produced at each mating. Eggs are laid in the male's territory, which he defends. The male takes care of the eggs, sometimes joined by the female. The eggs hatch after 14 to 18 days, and after 10 to 12 weeks the tadpoles are fully mature. Both sexes reach sexual maturity at two years of age. The expected lifespan of D. tinctorius Azureus is between 4 and 6 years in the wild and about 10 years in captivity.

Feeding
The blue poison dart frog feeds on fire ants and insects which may have poisonous chemical which makes the blue poison dart frog poisonous. Other than that it also feeds on beetles, flies, mites, spiders, termites, maggots, and caterpillars.

Captive care

In captivity, like most captive dart frogs, they eat a staple diet of fruit flies, pinhead crickets, rice flour beetle larvae, and springtails.

References

External links

University of Michigan

Amphibians
Dendrobates
Aposematic species
Frogs of South America
Amphibians of Brazil
Articles containing video clips